The 2014–15 Russian Basketball Cup was the 14th season of the annual cup tournament in Russia.

The Final Four was played in Novosibirsk on 28–29 March 2015.

Rules
Teams were only allowed to play with Russian players.

Participants
Defending champions Unics Kazan did not participate, just like other Russian Euroleague teams CSKA Moscow, Nizhny Novgorod.

Of the VTB United League, only 3 teams (Khimki, Krasnye Krylia and Krasny Oktyabr) participated.

Final four

References

Russian Basketball Cup
Cup